Something Wicked This Way Comes is a 1962 dark fantasy novel by Ray Bradbury. It is about two 13-year-old best friends, Jim Nightshade and William Halloway, and their nightmarish experience with a traveling carnival that comes to their Midwestern home, Green Town, Illinois, on October 24th. In dealing with the creepy figures of this carnival, the boys learn how to combat fear. The carnival's leader is the mysterious "Mr. Dark", who seemingly wields the power to grant the townspeople's secret desires. In reality, Dark is a malevolent being who, like the carnival, lives off the life force of those they enslave. Mr. Dark's presence is countered by that of Will's father, Charles Halloway, the janitor of the town library, who harbors his own secret fear of growing older because he feels he is too old to be Will's dad.

The novel combines elements of fantasy and horror, analyzing the conflicting natures of good and evil that exist within all individuals. Unlike many of Bradbury's other novel-length works, such as Dandelion Wine and The Martian Chronicles,  which are fix-ups, Something Wicked This Way Comes is a single, full-length narrative.

The title is taken from "By the pricking of my thumbs, something wicked this way comes", a line said by the witches in Shakespeare's Macbeth.

Background
One of the events in Ray Bradbury's childhood that inspired him to become a writer was an encounter with a carnival magician named Mr. Electrico who commanded him to "Live forever!" The 12-year-old Bradbury, intrigued at the concept of eternal life, revisited Mr. Electrico, who spurred his passion for life by heralding him as the reincarnation of a friend lost in World War I. After that memorable day, Bradbury began writing nonstop.

The novel originated in 1955 when Bradbury suggested to his friend Gene Kelly that they collaborate on a movie for Kelly to direct. Kelly was encouraging of the idea, and Bradbury spent the next five weeks adapting his 1948 short story "The Black Ferris" into an 80-page treatment. Kelly shopped the project to various studios, but was unable to obtain financial backing for the movie. Bradbury then gradually expanded the treatment into the novel over a five-year period. He converted the benign presence of Mr. Electrico into a more sinister one and incorporated several members he met at the same carnival with Mr. Electrico, including the Illustrated Man and the Skeleton Man.

The book's autumnal setting was intended as a thematic sequel to Bradbury's summer-tinged Dandelion Wine. Both works are set in the fictitious Green Town (based on Bradbury's hometown, Waukegan, Illinois) but have different tones, with the seasons in which they are set reflecting different aspects of the transition from childhood to adulthood. While none of the characters in Dandelion Wine reappear in Something Wicked This Way Comes, Will Halloway and Jim Nightshade can be viewed as one-year older representations of Dandelion Wine'''s Douglas Spaulding and John Huff, respectively. These two novels, coupled with Bradbury's official 2006 sequel to Dandelion Wine, Farewell Summer, constitute what Bradbury has termed his "Green Town Trilogy". The 2008 short story collection Summer Morning, Summer Night is also set almost entirely in Green Town.

Plot summary
The novel opens on an overcast October 23. Two friends – William "Will" Halloway and Jim Nightshade – both on the verge of their 14th birthdays, encounter a strange lightning rod salesman, Tom Fury. He announces that a storm is coming their way. The salesman gives Jim a lightning rod because he tells the boys that one of their houses is in danger. Throughout the night, Will and Jim meet up with townsfolk who also sense something in the air. Among the townspeople is Will's 54-year-old father, Charles Halloway, who works in the local library. Both Mr. Halloway and the boys learn about the carnival that is to start the next day. Jim and Will are excited that a carnival has come so late in the year, but Charles has a bad feeling about it.

The boys run out to watch the carnival arrive at three in the morning. As the train pulls in, the smoke billows in circles and solidifies as the carnival. The boys go the next day to explore the carnival and encounter their 7th grade teacher, Miss Foley, who is dazed after visiting the Mirror Maze. Jim insists on coming back that night and Will agrees, but when they bump into the lightning-rod salesman's abandoned bag, they realize that they must stay to learn what happens after dark. After investigating all of the rides, they go up to a carousel, which has an out-of-order sign. Mr. Cooger suddenly grabs Will and Jim after they climb up on horses and he informs them the merry-go-round is broken. Mr. Dark arrives and tells him to put them down. He pays attention only to Jim, who is enthralled by what he sees. The boys run away and then hide and wait. Both witness Mr. Cooger riding backwards on the carousel (as the music plays backwards), and when he steps off, to their shock, he is 12 years old.
 
They follow young Mr. Cooger to Miss Foley's house, where he pretends to be the nephew she was expecting. Jim tries to talk with him, because he wants to ride the carousel, but Will stops him. Jim takes off in the direction of the carnival. When Will catches up, Mr. Cooger is riding the carousel growing older, and Jim is about to join him. Will knocks the switch on the carousel and it flies out of control, spinning rapidly forward. Mr. Cooger ages over 100 years before it stops, and Jim and Will take off. They return with the police, but Mr. Cooger is nowhere to be found. Inside the tents they find him all set up as a new act, "Mr. Electrico", a man they run electricity through. Mr. Dark tells the boys to come back to the carnival the next day. Will tries to keep his father out of the situation, promising him that he will tell all soon. That night, the Dust Witch floats by in her balloon to find Jim and Will. Will lures her to an abandoned house and destroys her balloon with a bow and arrow. They later both dream of a bizarre funeral for the balloon, featuring a giant, misshapen coffin.
 
The next day the boys find a girl crying on the curb and realize she is the former Miss Foley made young again but also totally blind. They assist her to her house, but when they return they're cut off by a parade. The carnival is out searching the streets for the two of them. The boys hide, and Will's father spots them hiding under a storm drain in front of the cigar store. The boys convince him to keep quiet. Mr. Dark later arrives to talk to him. Mr. Halloway pretends not to know the two boys, whose faces are tattooed on the man's hand, but when the Witch comes and begins to sense the boys' presence, he blows cigar smoke at her, choking her and forcing her to leave. Mr. Dark then asks Charles Halloway for his name, and Will's father tells him he is the town library's janitor. That night Will and Jim meet him at the library where he has done research into his own father's ministerial notes. The carnival arrives once a generation, and leaves in the midst of a giant storm. Mr. Dark appears, and the boys hide in the book stacks. He discovers both of them and crushes the janitor's hand when Mr. Halloway attempts to fight him. The tarot witch casts spells on the boys to mesmerize them and also tries to stop Mr. Halloway's heart. Just before he is about to die, Charles looks at the Witch and begins to laugh hysterically. His laughter wounds her deeply and drives her away. He then follows Mr. Dark to the carnival to rescue the boys.
 
At the carnival, Charles triumphs over Mr. Dark, finds his son in the mirror maze, kills the Witch with a smile on a bullet, and destroys all the mirrors by using laughter and cheer. Then he and Will search for Jim. Mr. Cooger turns to dust and blows away before he can be saved by the carousel. Jim runs to the merry-go-round and rides it forward. Will tries to stop him and grabs onto his leg. They both end up going for a ride before Will jumps off and rips Jim away from the machine. Jim falls into a stupor, close to death. A child comes begging them to help him, but Mr. Halloway recognizes the boy as Mr. Dark. He holds the boy tight and kills him with affection, because Mr. Dark cannot survive in such close contact with someone so happy. The carnival falls apart as Will tries to revive Jim. They save Jim by singing and dancing and laughing, their happiness bringing him back from the edge of death.

Characters
William "Will" Halloway
Born one minute before midnight on October 30, Will is described as having done "only six years of staring". He is described as having white-blonde hair with eyes "as clear as summer rain". Will is naturally obedient and wary of getting involved in difficult situations; nonetheless, he takes on an active role in fighting the carnival's evil power.
James "Jim" Nightshade
Born one minute after midnight on October 31, Jim is brooding and brash, acting as a foil for Will's cautiousness and practicality. He is described as having wild and tangled chestnut brown hair and eyes the color of "green-glass fire". Jim yearns to become older, which makes him vulnerable to the carnival's temptations, but he is ultimately saved by his friendship with Will.
Charles Halloway
A middle-aged man who starts out in the novel as quiet and unhappy. He's not very close to his son, but eventually gains self-awareness and faith while up against the carnival (defeating the "Dust Witch" and "Jed/Mr. Dark"). He becomes a fighter in his own right by the end of the novel, along with gaining the admiration, love, and friendship of his son.
G. M. Dark
The main antagonist, he is a sinister man who bears tattoos all over his body, one for each person successfully tempted into joining the carnival. Mr. Dark initially holds sway over the other main characters, but his power weakens when Charles uses positive emotions against him, something he cannot comprehend or withstand. Dark's background is a mystery, although when asked if he reads the Bible, he replies, "I've had every page, line and word read at me, sir!" This could refer to a possible Christian upbringing, or his victims quoting.  
J. C. Cooger
Dark's partner in running the carnival, Mr. Cooger, is a fierce, red-headed man who is first seen repairing the carousel. He catches and terrifies Will and Jim until Mr. Dark intervenes. In the guise of her twelve-year-old nephew, he is able to persuade Miss Foley to come to the carnival. The tables are turned on him, however, when Will increases the speed of the carousel as Mr. Cooger is riding it, causing him to rapidly age to the point of decrepitude. At the climax of the book, he crumbles into dust and dies when the freaks accidentally drop him while carrying him back to the carousel. Like Mr. Dark, his origins are unknown.
The Dust Witch
A blind soothsayer possessing a sixth sense and the ability to perform many feats of magic, the Witch is portrayed as one of the carnival's most dangerous members. However, her increased sensitivity to the presence and emotions of other people makes her vulnerable to positive feelings. Charles uses this weakness to kill her with a bullet carved with a smile.  Her origins are unknown, but she is illustrated on Mr. Dark's wrist as a "black-nun blind woman". 
Miss Foley
A fifty-year-old schoolteacher of Will and Jim. Much like the other victims of the carnival, Miss Foley wished to become young. Her wish is granted, although she is transformed into a little girl with all her memories intact, unable to return to her former life and with no one to take care of her. It is not stated in the novel what happened to Miss Foley at the end.
The Skeleton
An extremely thin, skeleton-like creature who is one of the more frequently appearing freaks. Like all of the other freaks, he once desired to be younger and was eventually tricked into joining the carnival. The Skeleton appears to be one of the more loyal freaks as, near the book's end, he takes the time to carry the recently deceased and young Mr. Dark with him after all the other freaks ran away. He is last seen walking away into the hills that border the town.
Tom Fury/Dwarf
A lightning rod salesman who, succumbing to his desire to see the Most Beautiful Woman in the World, is turned into an insane dwarf by the carnival and is recruited into it, with no memories of his former life.

Themes
As in Dandelion Wine, Bradbury infuses the novel with nostalgia for his childhood. However, Dandelion Wine embodies the idyllic memories of youth, whereas Something Wicked This Way Comes superimposes folk-tale and supernatural elements over a small-town Americana setting in order to explore the dark undercurrents that surround the transition to adulthood.

The novel also conveys the theme that the power of people, objects, and ideas have over you depends on the power you instill in them with your own mind. Because of this, the carnival is able to easily take advantage of the common human fears of aging, death, and loneliness which everyone has or relates to.

Self-centered desires and wishes are portrayed as the base of human malice and unhappiness because they blind people to the blessings of life with an unattainable dream. The novel's main example of this is Miss Foley's seduction by Cooger's promise of youth that causes her to fail to see his deception as her "nephew" and lose her rightful place in society.

It is implied that the counter-force against this is acceptance of one's faults and an enthusiastic pursuit of the everyday joys of life, signified by Charles' spontaneous running with Jim and Will at the end of the novel. The fact that he is nearly forty years older than them pales in comparison to the pleasure he gains from simple human companionship.

Reception
Critics have praised Something Wicked This Way Comes as a classic of fantasy and horror, noting its masterful blending of both genres and Bradbury's unusual and mesmerizing prose. The most referenced characteristic of the novel's plot is its unusual subtlety and realism for its genres.

The magazine Science Fiction Weekly published a review of the novel; an excerpt of it follows:Science Fiction Crowsnest, another science fiction magazine, reviewed it with high praise, referring to it as a "Masterwork" with "a suitably fantastic and scary plot around colourful description ... with hidden meanings, mysteries and symbols adding to the layers of tension".

The Denver Rocky Mountain News said in 1999: "If rational beings had created the 100 best books of the century list, this one would surely have been on it".

Legacy and literary influenceSomething Wicked This Way Comes has served as a direct influence on several fantasy and horror authors, including Neil Gaiman and Stephen King. Gaiman paid tribute to Bradbury's influence on him and many of his peers in a 2012 The Guardian article following Bradbury's death. King discusses this novel at length in his 1981 non-fiction book Danse Macabre.

The book influenced R. L. Stine, who said, "Ray Bradbury is one of my favorite authors. I always tell people that the scariest book I ever read was one of his books—Something Wicked This Way Comes". Clive Barker also placed the book fourth on his list of greatest books about good and evil, number one being Moby Dick. 

Reference in other works

Stephen King mentions the book in his 1979 novel The Dead Zone and echoes the beginning scene of it by referring to a lightning-rod salesman in a chapter titled "Dark Carnival". His novels 'Salem's Lot (1975), Needful Things (1991) and Fairy Tale (2022) also contain references from Something Wicked This Way Comes.

Don Coscarelli has cited the novel as a major inspiration for his 1979 film Phantasm.

The TV show South Park parodied the novel in the 2004 episode "Something Wall-Mart This Way Comes" with a similar plot about the titular department store luring townsfolk with its super-low prices. British TV comedy series The League of Gentlemen features the Pandemonium Carnival of Papa Lazarou. In similar vein, the animated TV show Rick and Morty paid homage to the novel in an episode titled "Something Ricked This Way Comes", which centers around a comically-shadowy figure granting the citizens of the town wishes, but the plot largely draws upon Needful Things by Stephen King. UK Horror soundtrack producer Sam Haynes has released two Halloween themed albums influenced by the novel, The Incredible Dark Carnival and Something Wicked.

The band Creature Feature released a song titled "The Greatest Show Unearthed", which references the novel and takes heavy inspiration for the lyrics.
The band Vernian Process released a song titled "Something Wicked", which shares the novel's setting.

The heavy metal thrash band Nuclear Assault also had the same song title referencing the lyric phrase and their self titled video was also on the same self titled album.

American progressive rock band Stencil Forest released a song called "The Pandemonium Shadow Show" on their debut album Opening Act, which references the novel and is a straightforward adaptation of the novel. 

Hard Rock band Starset released a song also titled "Something Wicked" with parallels to the novel in their song and album's lore, including the novel's title being sang at the end of the song.The Night Circus by Erin Morgenstern features fraternal twins born either side of midnight on opening night of the Cirque de Reves by several minutes. Widget the boy is born first, on the 31st of October. His sister Poppet is born 1st of November. Each possesses bright red hair and a talent for 'seeing' the past (Widget) or the future (Poppet). They are the only circus performers in the plot who age.

American musician Tessa Violet named her 2016 EP Halloway after Will Halloway. Violet listened to audiobook version while on tour after her mom said it was "one of the scariest books she's read, and one of the most well-written".

The Dungeons and Dragons Fifth Edition module "The Wild Beyond the Witchlight" has taken inspiration from Bradbury's book. The carnival at the beginning of the adventure has clear resemblances to Bradbury's carnival, and the back cover begins with the line 'Something Wicked this Way Comes'.

Also, American musical artist Harry Nilsson named his debut album “Pandemonium Shadow Show”, famously calling it “Shandemanium Shadow Poe” in a spoken word moment that opens the album.

Adaptations
The novel was adapted for a low-budget 1972 British film, produced by the Forest Hill Film Unit & Drama Troupe and directed by Colin Finbow.

The novel was made into the 1983 The Bryna Company-Walt Disney Productions film Something Wicked This Way Comes, with Bradbury as the screenwriter. The production had been in development since the mid-1970s and was originally meant to be financed and distributed by Paramount Pictures. In a later interview, Bradbury said that he considered the film one of the better adaptations of his works.

Bradbury's Pandemonium Theatre Company performed a play based on the novel in Los Angeles on October 1, 2003, directed by Alan Neal Hubbs, also associated with the 1970 stage adaptation of Bradbury's 1950 book The Martian Chronicles. The main cast was Grady Hutt as Will Halloway, J. Skylar Testa as Jim Nightshade, Jay Gerber as Charles Halloway, and Mark Aaron as Mr. Dark. Critics gave the play generally favorable reviews, stating that it captured the lyricism and dark tone of the novel.Perlmutter, Sharon. Talkin' Broadway Regional News & Reviews: 'Something Wicked This Way Comes'. Retrieved on January 2, 2007. They also praised its special effects, which included a carousel constructed of mirrors with actors as the horses, and Jay Gerber as Charles Halloway. Sharon Perlmutter of Talkin' Broadway, however, said that Hutt and Testa gave bland performances as the two lead characters.Something Wicked This Way Comes was produced as a full-cast radio play by the Colonial Radio Theatre on the Air, and released by Blackstone Audio on October 1, 2007. Ray Bradbury wrote the script, modified for audio from his stage play. The cast includes Jerry Robbins as Mr. Halloway, J.T. Turner as Mr. Dark, Anastas Varinos as Will Halloway, and Matthew Scott Robertson as Jim Nightshade. This production was directed by Nancy Curran Willis, with music by Jeffrey Gage and post-production by Chris Snyder.

Catherine Wheels adapted Something Wicked This Way Comes for the stage in coproduction with the National Theatre of Scotland in 2008. The production opened at the Byre Theatre, St Andrews on October 27, 2009 and toured the UK.Something Wicked This Way Comes was produced as a radio play for the BBC Radio 4 Saturday Play'' series and was broadcast on 29 October 2011. The production was adapted for radio by Diana Griffiths and produced/directed by Pauline Harris with music by David Paul Jones and sound by Paul Cargill. The cast included Theo Gregory as Will, Josef Lindsay as Jim, Henry Goodman as Charles Halloway, Gerard McDermott as Mr. Cooger/The Lightning Rod Salesman and Kenneth Cranham as Mr. Dark.

Release details
 1962, U.S., Simon & Schuster, Pub date: September 1962, hardcover (First edition)
 1963, U.S. Bantam (ASIN B000NQBVPO Bantam # H2630), Pub date: September 1963, paperback (first printing)
 1983, U.S., Alfred A. Knopf, Pub date: March 1983, hardcover
 1997, U.S., Bantam US, Pub date: December 1997, paperback (Grand Master Editions)
 1998, U.S., Avon, Pub date: March 1998, paperback (Mass Market Paperback)
 1999, U.S., Eos, Pub date: June 1999, hardcover
 2001, U.S., Bookspan, Pub date: 2001, hardcover

Notes

External links
 
 Something Wicked This Way Comes by Ray Bradbury, reviewed by Ted Gioia (Conceptual Fiction)
 Official Ray Bradbury website
 Something Wicked This Way Comes learning guide, analysis, quotes, & teacher resources
 BBC Radio 4 Saturday Play: Something Wicked This Way Comes

1962 American novels
1962 fantasy novels
American horror novels
Novels by Ray Bradbury
American fantasy novels adapted into films
Waukegan, Illinois
Novels set in Illinois
Dark fantasy novels
Witchcraft in written fiction
Halloween novels
Novels adapted into radio programs
American novels adapted into plays
Macbeth